Dark End of the Street is the second studio album recorded by Irish Celtic rock band Moving Hearts. The album features folk singer Christy Moore on most of the songs, except "Let Somebody Know", written and sung by Declan Sinnott.

Two versions of Dark End of the Street, with identical front covers, were released simultaneously as vinyl LPs in 1982: one was a studio album and the other was released in some countries as a compilation album, with a different track listing. The original studio album was re-released on CD in 1995.

Studio album
The studio album was released as a vinyl LP in 1982.

Track listing

Compilation album

In some countries (US and Canada), a vinyl LP was also released in 1982 with the same title and front cover, but a different track listing, as a compilation of tracks selected from the following studio albums:
Moving Hearts (1981) – (tracks: 1, 2, 4, 6, 9) 
Dark End of the Street (1982) – (tracks: 3, 5, 7, 8, 10).

The catalogue number for this compilation album was: 'WEA 1802' in the US and 'WEA MH15' in Canada.

Track listing

Re-release of the studio album on CD

The studio album was re-released on CD in 1995, with the original track list.

Track listing

Personnel
The two versions of the 1982 album featured the following musicians: 
Christy Moore – vocals, guitar, bodhrán
Dónal Lunny – vocals, bouzouki, synthesiser
Declan Sinnott – lead guitar, acoustic, vocals
Tony Davis – backing vocals
Eoghan O'Neill – bass guitar, vocals
Matt Kellaghan – drums
Brian Calnan – drums, percussion
Davy Spillane – Uilleann pipes, low whistle
Keith Donald – Tenor and Soprano saxophone
Nollaig Casey (credited as Nollaig Ni Cathasaigh) – violin

References

External links
 Official website.

1982 albums
Moving Hearts albums